Brasiliconus is a subgenus  of sea snails, cone snails, marine gastropod mollusks in the genus Conus,  family Conidae, the cone snails and their allies.

In the new classification of the family Conidae by Puillandre N., Duda T.F., Meyer C., Olivera B.M. & Bouchet P. (2015), Brasiliconus has become a subgenus of Conus: Conus (Brasiliconus) Petuch, 2013  represented as Conus Thiele, 1929

Species list
This list of species is based on the information in the WoRMS list. Species within the genus Brasiliconus include:
 Brasiliconus scopulorum (van Mol, Tursch & Kempf, 1971): synonym of Conus (Brasiliconus) scopulorum van Mol, Tursch & Kempf, 1971 represented as Conus scopulorum van Mol, Tursch & Kempf, 1971

References

 Petuch E. (2013) Biogeography and biodiversity of western Atlantic mollusks. CRC Press. 252 pp.

Conidae
Gastropod subgenera